"Easy" is a song written by Katrina Elam and Michael Mobley and recorded by the American country music group Rascal Flatts as a duet with British pop singer Natasha Bedingfield.  It was released in June 2011 as the third and final single from Rascal Flatts' album Nothing Like This.  It became Rascal Flatts' fifth AC Top 20 hit. As of the chart dated July 21, 2012, the song has sold 917,000 copies in the US.

Content
"Easy" is a midtempo ballad in 6/8 time signature with a vocal range from C4 to C6. The song begins in C-sharp minor and modulates up to E minor halfway through the second verse.

Critical reception

Jessica Phillips of Country Weekly called the song a "sizzling duet". Stephen Thomas Erlewine of Allmusic was less favorable, calling it a "questionable stab at pop radio crossover". Ben Foster of Country Universe gave the song a B, saying that the lyrics are simple, but effective at telling the story of two ex-lovers who are in denial of the strong feelings they still harbor for one another. Billy Dukes of Taste of Country gave the song four stars out of five, calling it "a daring collaboration and fits right into the Rascal Flatts wheelhouse."

Music video
The music video for the song premiered on CMT.com on July 1, 2011.

Charts

Year-end charts

Certifications

References

2010 songs
2011 singles
Big Machine Records singles
country ballads
Vocal collaborations
music videos directed by Peter Zavadil
Natasha Bedingfield songs
Rascal Flatts songs
song recordings produced by Dann Huff
songs written by Katrina Elam